This is a summary of the electoral history of Francis Bell, Prime Minister of New Zealand (1925), Mayor of Wellington (1891–93; 1896–97), Member of Parliament for Wellington (1893–96).

Parliamentary elections

1890 election

1892 by-election

1893 election

Local elections

1891 election

1892 election

1896 election

References

Bell, Francis